The Hudson River Valley National Heritage Area a congressionally designated area which includes the Hudson Valley in the U.S. state of New York from Saratoga Springs south almost to New York City. It is one of 55 National Heritage Areas in the United States. It provides a unified promotional framework for a select number of the area's tourist attractions, with concentration on the area's architecture, history, landscape, artistic heritage and environment, as well as interpretation of the area's historical significance in the American Revolution, the Industrial Revolution and its continuing history through the present day.

History
The Hudson River Valley National Heritage Area was designated in 1996.
The designated area includes Albany, Rensselaer, Columbia, Greene, Ulster, Dutchess, Orange, Putnam, Westchester and Rockland counties, as well as the village of Waterford in Saratoga County.

Designated sites
Sites were originally organized by 3 themes: Freedom and Dignity, Nature and Culture and Corridor of Commerce.  Major sites within the National Heritage Area include West Point, Saratoga National Historical Park, Olana State Historic Site, Thomas Cole National Historic Site, Clermont State Historic Site, Eleanor Roosevelt National Historic Site, Home of Franklin D. Roosevelt National Historic Site, the Walkway Over the Hudson, Lyndhurst, Jay Estate and Vanderbilt Mansion National Historic Site.

These sites are estimated to generate $20 million in economic impact as a result of annual events hosted to attract tourism.

Publications
The list of sites is accompanied by a website and guidebook. The Hudson River Valley Institute at Marist College is the academic arm of the Hudson River Valley National Heritage Area.

References

External links
 Hudson River Valley National Heritage Area official site

 
National Heritage Areas of the United States
Protected areas established in 1996
1996 establishments in New York (state)
Protected areas of Albany County, New York
Protected areas of Rensselaer County, New York
Protected areas of Columbia County, New York
Protected areas of Greene County, New York
Protected areas of Ulster County, New York
Protected areas of Dutchess County, New York
Protected areas of Orange County, New York
Protected areas of Putnam County, New York
Protected areas of Westchester County, New York
Protected areas of Rockland County, New York
Protected areas of Saratoga County, New York